The Middletown Subdivision is a railroad line owned by CSX Transportation in the U.S. State of Ohio. At its south end it branches off of the Toledo Subdivision at Middletown Junction and at its north end the line branches off thru Lind Yard than enters AK Steel Middletown Works, after crossing the Norfolk Southern Dayton District on the High Line or on a diamond the line continues north with the track ending at Cohen Recycling.

M7-Middletown Subdivision information

History

Initial sections

The Former B&O branch from New Miami, Ohio,  to Middletown, Ohio, was built for the express purpose of serving the massive steel mill belonging to the ARMCO Steel (now known as AK Steel. CSX Transportation still uses this line daily as its Middletown Subdivision of the Louisville Division.

Consolidation
The B&O itself merged with the C&O in 1987, which itself became part of CSX Transportation in that year.

Milepost

See also
 List of CSX Transportation lines
 AK Steel

References

CSX Transportation lines